Janesville is an unincorporated community in Coles and Cumberland counties, Illinois, United States. Janesville has a post office with the ZIP Code 62435.

Demographics

References

Unincorporated communities in Coles County, Illinois
Unincorporated communities in Cumberland County, Illinois
Unincorporated communities in Illinois